The Second Vogel Ministry was a responsible government which held power in New Zealand from February to September 1876.

Background
The Continuous Ministry had abolished the Provinces and carried out an extensive public works scheme by the time Sir Julius Vogel returned to New Zealand from a mission seeking a further loan from London. He now reassumed the Premiership, but previous supporters of Vogel’s policies, such as John Davies Ormond, now refused to serve in Government and pressured the Ministry to retrench public spending. Additionally, the abolition of the Provinces meant that the central government now had to pay for public education, leading to reduced spending, cuts in the public works and immigration budget, and another £2 million overseas loan.  

The liberal opposition, led by Sir George Grey, blocked the final sale of the Piako Swamp to a syndicate led by Thomas Russell, arguing that a direct sale of confiscated Māori land was illegal and that the Government was giving favourable treatment to a wealthy banker and political ally. The Government was saved on this issue by the Speaker’s casting vote.

When the House met, Vogel resigned, citing personal attacks from the Opposition over his perceived extravagance with the finances at a time of low export prices. He also had a “morbid fear” of dying poor, so he arranged to hand over the Premiership to someone who would appoint him to the salaried position of Agent-General - in September, he landed on Harry Atkinson.

Ministers
The following members served in the Vogel Ministry:

See also
 New Zealand Government

Notes

References

Ministries of Queen Victoria
Governments of New Zealand
1876 establishments in New Zealand
Vogel Ministry
Vogel Ministry